Kortfors railway station was a railway station in Kortfors, a former railway junction, in Karlskoga Municipality, Sweden.

The Kortfors station opened in 1874 when the Nora–Karlskoga Line was inaugurated. A siding to Karlsdals Bruk also opened the same year. In 1966, passenger traffic between Nora and Karlskoga was discontinued and Kortfors was downgraded. In 1985, freight traffic was also discontinued.

References 

Buildings and structures in Karlskoga Municipality
Railway stations in Örebro County